Kyss Mej is the second studio solo album by Swedish indie-pop singer Helena Josefsson in Swedish, released on 9 February 2011.

Track listing 
 Nån annanstans, nån annan gång (3:22)
 Päronskogen (3:17)
 Grönöga (2:51)
 I spegeln (feat. Timbuktu) (4:00)
 Knockout (4:05)
 Ballad till Jorden (2:48)
 Vi kan börja om (To Tragoudi Ton Gifton) (3:44)
 Inuti hjärtat (3:01)
 Kyss mej (2:57)
 Fén & jag (3:04)
 Vi möts igen nånstans (2:10)

Videos 
 «Fen & jag» (first published on YouTube 17 October 2009)
 «Kyss mej» (2010) (dir. Cecilia Nordlund)

External links
 Helena Josefsson's Official Site
 Helena Josefsson's Official Blog with pictures
 Helena Josefsson's Official Forum

Roxette
Helena Josefsson albums
2011 albums